The girls' 1500 metres speed skating competition of the Innsbruck 2012 Winter Youth Olympics was held at Eisschnellaufbahn on 16 January 2012.

Results
The races were held at 10:30.

References

External links 
 olympedia.org
 

Speed skating at the 2012 Winter Youth Olympics